Thomas John Collins (14 August 1895 – 8 April 1957) was a Welsh rugby union, and professional rugby league footballer who played in the 1920s. He played representative level rugby union (RU) for Wales, and at club level for Mountain Ash RFC, as a centre, i.e. number 12 or 13, and club level rugby league (RL) for Hull FC.

Background
Tom Collins was born in Merthyr Tydfil, and he died aged 61 in Mountain Ash.

International honours
Tom Collins won a cap for Wales (RU) while at Mountain Ash RFC in 1923 against Ireland.

References

External links
Search for "Collins" at rugbyleagueproject.org

(archived by web.archive.org) Stats → Past Players → C at hullfc.com (statistics for player surnames beginning with 'C' and 'D' swapped)
 (archived by web.archive.org) Statistics at hullfc.com

1895 births
1957 deaths
Hull F.C. players
Mountain Ash RFC players
Rugby league players from Merthyr Tydfil
Rugby league centres
Rugby union centres
Rugby union players from Merthyr Tydfil
Wales international rugby union players
Welsh rugby league players
Welsh rugby union players